Harrison Hagan Schmitt (born July 3, 1935) is an American geologist, retired NASA astronaut, university professor, former U.S. senator from New Mexico, and the most recent living person—and only person without a background in military aviation—to have walked on the Moon.

In December 1972, as one of the crew on board Apollo 17, Schmitt became the first member of NASA's first scientist-astronaut group to fly in space. As Apollo 17 was the last of the Apollo missions, he also became the twelfth and second-youngest person to set foot on the Moon and the second-to-last person to step off of the Moon (he boarded the Lunar Module shortly before commander Eugene Cernan). Schmitt also remains the only professional scientist to have flown beyond low Earth orbit and to have visited the Moon. He was influential within the community of geologists supporting the Apollo program and, before starting his own preparations for an Apollo mission, had been one of the scientists training those Apollo astronauts chosen to visit the lunar surface.

Schmitt resigned from NASA in August 1975 to run for election to the United States Senate as a member from New Mexico. As the Republican candidate in the 1976 election, he defeated Democratic incumbent Joseph Montoya. In the 1982 election, Schmitt was defeated by Democrat Jeff Bingaman.

Biography

Early life and education 
Born July 3, 1935, in Santa Rita, New Mexico, Schmitt grew up in nearby Silver City, and is a graduate of the Western High School (class of 1953). He received a B.S. degree in geology from the California Institute of Technology in 1957 and then spent a year studying geology at the University of Oslo in Norway, as a Fulbright Scholar. He received a Ph.D. in geology from Harvard University in 1964, based on his geological field studies in Norway.

NASA career 
Before joining NASA as a member of the first group of scientist-astronauts in June 1965, he worked at the U.S. Geological Survey's Astrogeology Center at Flagstaff, Arizona, developing geological field techniques that would be used by the Apollo crews. Following his selection, Schmitt spent his first year at Air Force UPT learning to become a jet pilot. Upon his return to the astronaut corps in Houston, he played a key role in training Apollo crews to be geologic observers when they were in lunar orbit and competent geologic field workers when they were on the lunar surface. After each of the landing missions, he participated in the examination and evaluation of the returned lunar samples and helped the crews with the scientific aspects of their mission reports.

Schmitt spent considerable time becoming proficient in the CSM and LM systems. In March 1970 he became the first of the scientist-astronauts to be assigned to space flight, joining Richard F. Gordon Jr. (Commander) and Vance Brand (Command Module Pilot) on the Apollo 15 backup crew. The flight rotation put these three in line to fly as prime crew on the third following mission, Apollo 18. When Apollo 18 and Apollo 19 were canceled in September 1970, the community of lunar geologists supporting Apollo felt so strongly about the need to land a professional geologist on the Moon, that they pressured NASA to reassign Schmitt to a remaining flight. As a result, Schmitt was assigned in August 1971 to fly on the last mission, Apollo 17, replacing Joe Engle as Lunar Module Pilot. Schmitt landed on the Moon with commander Gene Cernan in December 1972.

Schmitt claims to have taken the photograph of the Earth known as The Blue Marble, possibly one of the most widely distributed photographic images in existence.

While on the Moon's surface, Schmitt — the only geologist in the astronaut corps — collected the rock sample designated Troctolite 76535, which has been called "without doubt the most interesting sample returned from the Moon". Among other distinctions, it is the central piece of evidence suggesting that the Moon once possessed an active magnetic field.

As he returned to the Lunar Module before Cernan, Schmitt is the next-to-last person to have walked on the Moon's surface. Since the death of Cernan in 2017, Schmitt is the most recent person to have walked on the Moon who is still alive. After the completion of the Apollo 17 mission, Schmitt played an active role in documenting the Apollo geologic results and also took on the task of organizing NASA's Energy Program Office.

On April 29, 2018, the Schmitt Space Communicator SC-1x named in his honor was carried aboard the Blue Origin New Shepard crew capsule in a project partly funded by NASA. It launched the first commercial two-way data and wi-fi hotspot service in space and sent the first commercial Twitter message from space. The three-pound device was developed by Solstar, which Schmitt joined as an advisor, and launched 66 miles above the Earth's surface as a technology demonstration. The device was admitted to the Smithsonian National Air and Space Museum.

Senate career 

On August 30, 1975, Schmitt resigned from NASA to seek election as a Republican to the United States Senate representing New Mexico in the 1976 election. Schmitt campaigned for fourteen months, and his campaign focused on the future. In the Republican primary, held on June 1, 1976, Schmitt defeated Eugene Peirce. In the election, Schmitt opposed two-term Democratic incumbent Joseph Montoya. He defeated Montoya 57% to 42%.

He served one term and, notably, was the chairman of the Science, Technology, and Space Subcommittee of the United States Senate Committee on Commerce. He sought a second term in 1982, facing state Attorney General Jeff Bingaman. Bingaman attacked Schmitt for not paying enough attention to local matters; his campaign slogan asked, "What on Earth has he done for you lately?" This, combined with the deep recession, proved too much for Schmitt to overcome; he was defeated, 54% to 46%.

Post-Senate career 

Following his Senate term, Schmitt has been a consultant in business, geology, space, and public policy. Schmitt is an adjunct professor of engineering physics at the University of Wisconsin–Madison, and has long been a proponent of lunar resource utilization. In 1997 he proposed the Interlune InterMars Initiative, listing among its goals the advancement of private-sector acquisition and use of lunar resources, particularly lunar helium-3 as a fuel for notional nuclear fusion reactors.

Schmitt was chair of the NASA Advisory Council, whose mandate is to provide technical advice to the NASA Administrator, from November 2005 until his abrupt resignation on October 16, 2008. In November 2008, he quit the Planetary Society over policy advocacy differences, citing the organization's statements on "focusing on Mars as the driving goal of human spaceflight" (Schmitt said that going back to the Moon would speed progress toward a crewed Mars mission), on "accelerating research into global climate change through more comprehensive Earth observations" (Schmitt voiced objections to the notion of a present "scientific consensus" on climate change as any policy guide), and on international cooperation (which he felt would retard rather than accelerate progress), among other points of divergence.

Schmitt also serves as a visiting Senior Research Scientist at the Florida Institute for Human & Machine Cognition.

In January 2011, he was appointed as secretary of the New Mexico Energy, Minerals and Natural Resources Department in the cabinet of Governor Susana Martinez, but was forced to give up the appointment the following month after refusing to submit to a required background investigation. El Paso Times called him the "most celebrated" candidate for New Mexico energy secretary.

Schmitt wrote a book entitled Return to the Moon: Exploration, Enterprise, and Energy in the Human Settlement of Space in 2006. Schmitt is also involved in several civic projects, including the improvement of the Senator Harrison H. Schmitt Big Sky Hang Glider Park in Albuquerque, New Mexico.

Views on climate change 

Schmitt has rejected the scientific consensus on climate change, which states that climate change is real, progressing, dangerous, and primarily human-caused. He has claimed that climate change is predominantly caused by natural factors, as opposed to human activity. Schmitt has argued that the risks posed by climate change are overstated and has instead supported the notion that climate change is a "tool" used to advocate for the expansion of the government.

He resigned his membership in the Planetary Society primarily because of its Mars-first policy, but also because of its stance on global warming, writing in his resignation letter that the "'global warming scare' is being used as a political tool to increase government control over American lives, incomes and decision making. It has no place in the Society's activities." Schmitt spoke at the March 2009 International Conference on Climate Change, a climate-denier event hosted by the conservative Heartland Institute, where he said that climate change was a "stalking horse for National Socialism." He appeared in December that year on the Fox Business Network, saying that "[t]he CO2 scare is a red herring". 

In a 2009 interview with far-right conspiracy theorist and radio host Alex Jones, Schmitt asserted a link between the collapse of the Soviet Union and the American environmental movement: "I think the whole trend really began with the fall of the Soviet Union. Because the great champion of the opponents of liberty, namely communism, had to find some other place to go and they basically went into the environmental movement." 

Schmitt co-authored a 2013 Wall Street Journal opinion column with William Happer, contending that increasing levels of carbon dioxide in the atmosphere are not significantly correlated with global warming, attributing the "single-minded demonization of this natural and essential atmospheric gas" to advocates of government control of energy production. Noting a positive relationship between crop resistance to drought and increasing carbon dioxide levels, the authors argued, "Contrary to what some would have us believe, increased carbon dioxide in the atmosphere will benefit the increasing population on the planet by increasing agricultural productivity."

In popular culture 
 Schmitt was portrayed by Tom Amandes in the 1998 miniseries From the Earth to the Moon.
 He appeared in a 1993 episode of Bill Nye the Science Guy.
Comedian Norm MacDonald mentioned Schmitt in his stand-ups since at least 2015, joking about Schmitt's obscurity despite being one of only a few people to ever walk on the Moon.

Awards and honors 
 NASA Distinguished Service Medal (1973)
 He was made an honorary fellow of the Geological Society of America for his efforts in geoscience in 1984.
 1989 Recipient of the G. K. Gilbert Award
 One of the elementary schools in Schmitt's hometown of Silver City, New Mexico was named in his honor in the mid-1970s. An image of the astronaut riding a rocket through space is displayed on the front of Harrison Schmitt Elementary School.
 AAPG's Special Award has been changed to the Harrison Schmitt Award in 2011. It recognizes individuals or organizations that, for a variety of reasons, do not qualify for other Association honors or awards. Schmitt received the award in 1973 for his contribution as the first geologist to land on the Moon and study its geology.
 2015 Recipient of the Leif Erikson Exploration Award, awarded by The Exploration Museum, for his scientific work on the surface of the Moon in 1972, and for his part in the geology training of all the astronauts that walked on the Moon before him.

Schmitt was one of five inductees into the International Space Hall of Fame in 1977. He was one of 24 Apollo astronauts who were inducted into the U.S. Astronaut Hall of Fame in 1997.

Media 
Schmitt is one of the astronauts featured in the 2007 documentary In the Shadow of the Moon. He also contributed to the 2006 book NASA's Scientist-Astronauts by David Shayler and Colin Burgess.

See also

 The Astronaut Monument
 Astronaut–politician

References

External links 

 Interview with Harrison Schmitt for NOVA series: To the Moon WGBH Educational Foundation, raw footage, 1998
 Harrison Schmitt visits University of Malta in 2009 and Handaq School
 Spacefacts biography of Harrison Schmitt
 
 Space Policy Directive-1, in The Federal Register

|-

|-

 
1935 births
1972 in spaceflight
Living people
American astronauts
American astronaut-politicians
American geologists
Apollo program astronauts
Apollo 17
Articles containing video clips
California Institute of Technology alumni
Harvard University alumni
Military personnel from New Mexico
New Mexico Republicans
Penrose Medal winners
People from Santa Rita, New Mexico
People from Silver City, New Mexico
People who have walked on the Moon
Recipients of the NASA Distinguished Service Medal
Republican Party United States senators from New Mexico
Spacewalkers
State cabinet secretaries of New Mexico
United States Astronaut Hall of Fame inductees
University of Oslo alumni
University of Wisconsin–Madison faculty